Pyeongsan Lee clan was one of the Korean clans. Their Bon-gwan was in Pyongsan County, Hwanghae Province. According to the research in 2000, the number of Pyeongsan Lee clan was 3394. He was one of eight followers dispatched to Silla by Xue Rengui in Tang dynasty. Then, he was settled in Pyeongsan, and taught studies, and was called as Doctorate.

See also 
 Korean clan names of foreign origin

References

External links 
 

 
Korean clan names of Chinese origin